Uya Oro is an Oron Community and Town also the capital of Oron local government area of Akwa Ibom state in Nigeria.

References 

Places in Oron Nation
Villages in Akwa Ibom